Encoptolophus sordidus, known generally as clouded grasshopper, is a species of band-winged grasshopper in the family Acrididae. Other common names include the dusky grasshopper and dusky locust. It is found in North America.

References

Oedipodinae
Articles created by Qbugbot
Insects described in 1838